Steve Stewart is a former linebacker in the National Football League. He was drafted in the second round of the 1978 NFL Draft by the Atlanta Falcons and played that season with the team. The following season, he played with the Green Bay Packers.

References

Players of American football from Minneapolis
Atlanta Falcons players
Green Bay Packers players
American football linebackers
Minnesota Golden Gophers football players
1956 births
Living people